Marko Lunder (born 20 April 1983) is a retired Slovenian footballer player.

Career
He has spent much of his career playing for Domžale, and made an appearance in the side's first-round UEFA Cup match against Stuttgart.

References

External links
NZS profile 

1983 births
Living people
Footballers from Ljubljana
Slovenian footballers
Association football midfielders
NK Domžale players
NK Dob players
NK Radomlje players
NK Ivančna Gorica players
Slovenian PrvaLiga players
Slovenian Second League players